Mongmong-Toto-Maite is a municipality in the United States territory of Guam composed of three separate villages east of Hagåtña that experienced development after the Second World War.

Mongmong is adjacent to the Hagåtña Swamp; Toto is situated to the north-east near Barrigada; Maite is located on the cliffs overlooking Agana Bay and the Philippine Sea. The village's population has decreased since the island's 2010 census.

Demographics
The U.S. Census Bureau has multiple census-designated places: Maite, Mongmong, and Toto.

Education
Guam Public School System serves the island.

George Washington High School in Mangilao serves the village.

Populated places
Apurguan

Government

See also 
 Villages of Guam

References

Villages in Guam